La Merced Church, Antigua Guatemala
 La Merced Church, Burgos
 Convento de la Merced in Valdunquillo
 La Merced Cloister in Mexico City

See also 
 :es:Iglesia de la Merced